Air Vice Marshal William Vernon Crawford-Compton,  (2 March 1915 – 2 January 1988) was a New Zealand flying ace of the Royal Air Force (RAF) during the Second World War. He was officially credited with destroying at least 20 enemy aircraft. 

Born in Invercargill, Crawford-Compton joined the RAF in 1939. He qualified as a pilot the following year and was posted to No. 603 Squadron. In March 1941, he was transferred to a newly formed unit, No. 485 (NZ) Squadron. He flew numerous operations, including during the Channel Dash and was credited with a number of enemy aircraft destroyed. After recovering from injuries received in a crash landing, he served as a flight commander in No. 611 Squadron. He was given command of No. 64 Squadron at the end of 1942 and led it for the early part of the following year. After a period of staff duties, he became wing commander of the Hornchurch fighter wing in mid-1943, and led it until the end of the year. He spent three months in the United States giving lectures on RAF operations before returning to active duty as commander of No. 145 Wing. He led the wing in offensive operations in France in the run up to and after Operation Overlord.  After the war, he held a series of senior appointments in the RAF, retiring in late 1968. He died in January 1988 at the age of 72.

Early life
William Vernon Crawford-Compton was born in Invercargill, New Zealand on 2 March 1915, the son of William Gilbert Crawford-Compton and Ethel . The Crawford-Compton family later moved to Auckland, settling in Mission Bay. In 1938, he was working as a storeman in Waiuku when he decided to enlist in the Royal Air Force (RAF). He joined the crew of a ketch, with the intention of sailing to England where he would enlist in the RAF. 

The yacht, Land's End, left Auckland and began sailing through the South Pacific. After stops in Tonga and Fiji, as they neared New Guinea, Land's End struck an uncharted reef. The four crew built a raft and were able to make it to nearby  Rossel Island. They stayed with a local tribe for a time before making their way to Samari in New Guinea. There he gained a berth as a carpenter on a steamer heading for England. He eventually arrived at Liverpool on 6 September 1939, and promptly joined the RAF as an aircraftman.

Second World War
Although Crawford-Compton enlisted in the RAF in a groundcrew role, he was later selected for flight training. Once this was completed, towards the end of 1940, he was posted to No. 603 Squadron, based at Hornchurch, as a sergeant pilot. In March 1941 he was transferred to No. 485 (NZ) Squadron. His new unit, newly formed at Driffield, had a cadre of experienced New Zealand pilots. After a period of training, the squadron became operational on 12 April, flying Supermarine Spitfires on patrols over the North Sea. In June it graduated to taking part in offensive sweeps over the French coast and the following month was operating from Redhill. By this time Crawford-Compton had been commissioned in the Royal Air Force Volunteer Reserve (RAFVR) and was a probationary pilot officer.

Channel Front

Redhill was a satellite airfield to Kenley and No. 485 Squadron formed part of Kenley Wing, alongside No. 452 and No. 602 Squadrons. It flew 22 offensive operations in July during which seven pilots were lost. By September the tempo of operations had slowed, with the squadron only involved in seven operations. During one of these, on 21 September, Crawford-Compton engaged a Messerschmitt Bf 109, claiming it as a probable. The following month, while covering bombers attacking St. Omer on 13 October, he destroyed a Bf 109, claiming to have seen it break up in midair. As winter set in, offensive operations were scaled back but on one of the final sweeps of year, he claimed another Bf 109 as a probable. 

On 12 February 1942, No. 485 Squadron was among those scrambled during the Channel Dash, with Crawford-Compton leading one of its flights. He shot down a Bf 109, which crashed near Ostend. Another Bf 109 was reported as damaged. He was awarded the Distinguished Flying Cross (DFC) early the following month; the citation, published in The London Gazette, read:

In March, the Kenley Wing resumed offensive operations and on 26 March, while escorting Douglas Boston bombers attacking Le Havre, the squadron encountered large numbers of Bf 109s. Crawford-Compton, leading the squadron on this operation, shot down one of the enemy fighters during this engagement, and with Pilot Officer Evan Mackie, shared in the destruction of another. Two days later he shot down a Focke Wulf Fw 190, one of several put up by the Luftwaffe in response to a sweep mounted by the RAF that covered the French coast from Cap Gris-Nez to Dunkirk.

On 27 April, Crawford-Compton was involved in an accident when the engine of his Spitfire cut out while landing after an operation. During the resulting crash landing, he broke his wrist. This took him off flight operations for a time while he recovered and this meant he missed being given command of No. 485 Squadron, for its commander, Squadron Leader Edward Wells, was to be appointed to lead Kenley Wing. In August, once he recovered from his injuries, he was posted to No. 611 Squadron as one of its flight leaders. He soon was back in action, and damaged a Fw 190 on 19 August while flying one of two covering patrols he carried out during the Dieppe Raid. On the other patrol, he became separated from his section and was pursued by four Fw 190s, which only ceased the chase halfway across the English Channel. Five days later, he destroyed another Fw 190. He claimed to have shot down two more on 28 August, when his squadron was escorting Boeing B-17 Flying Fortresses of the United States Army Air Force (USAAF) on a bombing raid of an aircraft factory at Méaulte, near Amiens. On subsequent operations from September to early November, he was credited with damaging at least six Fw 190s. On 9 November he claimed a Fw 190 as destroyed. A further Fw 190 was claimed as a probable on 6 December.

On Christmas Day, Crawford-Compton was appointed commander of No. 64 Squadron and at the end of the year was awarded a bar to the DFC. The published citation read:

He was credited with damaging a Fw 190 on 20 January 1943 and damaged another one the following month. On 8 March he had two Fw 190s confirmed as destroyed. He gave up command of No. 64 Squadron shortly afterwards, at which time he was assigned a staff role at No. 11 Group. Despite his duties, he still occasionally flew on operations, and while flying with No. 122 Squadron was credited with damaging a Bf 109. In June he was appointed commander of the fighter wing at Hornchurch, which included No. 129 and No. 222 Squadrons. Much of the wing's work involved escorting bombers of the USAAF on raids to France. In recognition of these efforts, he was awarded the Silver Star, a United States gallantry medal. He destroyed a Bf 109 on 27 June. Another Bf 109 was destroyed on 19 August and this was followed by Fw 190s on 5 and 23 September. Shortly afterwards, his award of the Distinguished Service Order (DSO) was announced, the published citation reading: 

Within a few days of the announcement of his DSO, he was credited with the destruction of another Fw 190. It was to be his last claim for 1943, for at the end of the year, Crawford-Compton was taken off active duties and selected to go to the United States to give talks regarding the operations of RAF. Along with another experienced pilot, Wing Commander Raymond Harries, he spent three months in the country lecturing before returning to England.

Northwest Europe

In April 1944, Crawford-Compton appointed wing commander, flying, of the No. 145 Wing, which had two Free French squadrons of Spitfires. Under the overall command of Wing Commander Alan Deere, and later Group Captain Adolph Malan, the wing was part of the Second Tactical Air Force. In the prelude to Operation Overlord, the landings at Normandy, Crawford-Compton led the wing in attacks on targets in France, including transportation infrastructure, flying-bomb sites and military installations in the Pas-de-Calais. 

Following the invasion, his wing conducted regular patrols over Normandy and covering the Allied forces maintaining their hold on the bridgehead. The day after the landings, he intercepted and destroyed a Junkers Ju 88 which was among a group of five bombers that was attacking the landing beaches. As the Allied ground forces moved inland, the wing began operating from temporary airstrips established in the bridgehead at Normandy. It sought out and attacked German transports on the roads between Paris and Caen, disrupting the flow of supplies to the front lines. At the end of the month, he destroyed a Bf 109 and Fw 190 that had just taken off from Evereux airfield, with other pilots in the wing accounting for four other German aircraft.

As the Allies advanced further into Normandy, No. 145 Wing continued to provide support, carrying out fighter-bomber operations on the Falaise pocket and on 9 July, he destroyed a Bf 109. By the end of the year, Crawford-Compton's command was operating from Antwerp. Upon completion of his tour in early 1945, he was awarded a bar to his DSO and was posted to the headquarters of No. 11 Group, as a staff officer. He ended the war having flown at least 517 operational missions and was credited with destroying at least 20, possibly 21, enemy aircraft. He also shared in the destruction of one further enemy aircraft, claimed three probables and a share in a fourth, and 13 damaged.

Later life
In the postwar period, Crawford-Compton went to the RAF Staff College after which he formally transferred from the RAFVR to the regular RAF. He was granted a permanent commission with effect from 1 September 1945 although remained in his acting rank. After a period of service at the headquarters of Middle East Command in Cairo, he served as a time as the Air attache in Oslo, Norway. He then went on to command the RAF station at Bruggen in West Germany. In January 1955, he was promoted to group captain. 

During the Suez Crisis, he was commander of RAF Gamil in Egypt and for his services, in the Queen's Birthday Honours the following year, Crawford-Compton was appointed a Commander of the Order of the British Empire. In July 1960, his acting rank of air commodore was made permanent. Three years later he was promoted to air vice marshal. 

In the 1965 New Year Honours he was appointed a Companion of the Order of the Bath. He was the senior air staff officer in the Near East Air Force, based at Cyprus, until December 1965. He then succeeded Air Vice Marshal Albert Case in January 1966 as commander of No. 22 Group. This was Crawford-Compton's last appointment for he retired from the RAF in November 1968. He died in England on 2 January 1988.

Notes

References

External links
New Zealand Fighter Pilots Museum biography

1915 births
1988 deaths
Commanders of the Order of the British Empire
Companions of the Distinguished Service Order
Companions of the Order of the Bath
New Zealand commanders
New Zealand World War II pilots
New Zealand World War II flying aces
People from Invercargill
Recipients of the Distinguished Flying Cross (United Kingdom)
Chevaliers of the Légion d'honneur
New Zealand recipients of the Légion d'honneur
Recipients of the Silver Star
Royal Air Force air marshals
Royal Air Force Volunteer Reserve personnel of World War II